Puerto Rico competed at the 1984 Summer Olympics in Los Angeles, United States. 51 competitors, 43 men and 8 women, took part in 45 events in 13 sports.

Medalists

Archery

In the third time the nation competed in archery at the Olympics, Puerto Rico entered one man.

Men's Individual Competition
 Ismael Rivera — 2089 points (→ 58th place)

Athletics

Men's 200 metres
Luis Morales
Nelson Erazo

Men's Marathon
 Jorge Gonzáles
 Final — 2:14:00 (→ 13th place)

 César Mercado
 Final — 2:19:09 (→ 31st place)

 Claudio Cabán
 Final — 2:27:16 (→ 53rd place)

Men's 3,000 m Steeplechase
Carmelo Ríos

Men's Pole Vault
 Edgardo Rivera
 Qualifying Round — 5.10m (→ did not advance)

Women's 400 metres
Marie Mathieu

Women's 800 metres
Angelita Lind

Women's 4×400 metres Relay
Margaret de Jesús
Evelyn Mathieu
Marie Mathieu
Angelita Lind

Women's Marathon 
 Naydi Nazario 
 Final — 2:45:49 (→ 33rd place)

Women's High Jump 
Laura Agront
 Qualification — 1.80m (→ did not advance, 22nd place)

Women's Long Jump
Madeline de Jesús
 Qualification — 5.63 m (→ did not advance, 21st place)

Boxing

Men's Light Flyweight (– 48 kg)
 Rafael Ramos
 First Round — Defeated Carlos Salazar (Argentina), walk-over
 Second Round — Defeated Jesús Beltre (Dominican Republic), on points (4:1)
 Quarterfinals — Lost to Salvatore Todisco (Italy), on points (1:4)

Men's Flyweight (– 51 kg)
José Rivera

Men's Bantamweight (– 54 kg)
 Juan Molina
 First Round — Bye
 Second Round — Defeated Jarmo Eskelinen (Finland), 5-0
 Third Round — Lost to Pedro Nolasco (Dominican Republic), 2-3

Men's Featherweight (– 57 kg)
Orlando Fernández

Men's Lightweight (– 60 kg)
Luis Ortíz - Won the silver medal

Men's Light-Welterweight (– 63.5 kg)
Jorge Maysonet

Men's Welterweight (– 67 kg)
Carlos Reyes

Men's Light-Middleweight (– 71 kg)
Víctor Claudio

Men's Middleweight (– 75 kg)
 Arístides González → Bronze Medal
 First Round — Defeated Otosico Havili (Tonga), 4:1
 Second Round — Defeated Paulo Tuvale (Samoa), 5:0
 Quarterfinals — Defeated Pedro van Raamsdonk (Netherlands), 4:1
 Semifinals — Lost to Shin Joon-Sup (South Korea), 1:4

Men's Light-Heavyweight (– 81 kg)
Arcadio Fuentes

Men's Super Heavyweight (+ 91 kg)
 Isaac Barrientos
 First Round — Lost to Tyrell Biggs (USA), 0:5

Cycling

One cyclist represented Puerto Rico in 1984.

Individual road race
 Ramón Rivera — did not finish (→ no ranking)

Equestrianism

Fencing

Two male fencers represented Puerto Rico in 1984

Men's foil
 Edgardo Díaz

Men's épée
 Gilberto Peña

Judo

Men's Half-Middleweight
 Jorge Bonnet

Men's Middleweight
 José Fuentes

Rowing

Sailing

Shooting

Swimming

Men's 100m Freestyle
Fernando Cañales
 Heat — 51.75 (→ did not advance, 19th place)

Antonio Portela
 Heat — 52.47 (→ did not advance, 27th place)

Men's 200m Freestyle
Fernando Cañales
 Heat — 1:56.60 (→ did not advance, 37th place)

Men's 100m Butterfly
Filiberto Colon
 Heat — 56.66 (→ did not advance, 28th place)

Men's 200m Butterfly
Filiberto Colon
 Heat — 2:01.80
 B-Final — 2:01.27 (→ 12th place)

Men's 4 × 100 m Freestyle Relay 
Fernando Cañales, Miguel Figueroa, Antonio Portela, and Rafael Gandarillas
 Heat — 3:30.66 (→ did not advance, 14th place)

Weightlifting

Wrestling

Men's Bantamweight Freestyle
Orlando Caceres

Men's Featherweight Freestyle
Carmelo Flores

Men's Lightweight Freestyle
José Betancourt

See also

Puerto Rico at the 1983 Pan American Games
Sports in Puerto Rico

References

External links
Official Olympic Reports
International Olympic Committee results database

Nations at the 1984 Summer Olympics
1984
Olympics